Julia Middendorf (born 31 January 2003) is a German tennis player.

Middendorf has a career-high WTA singles ranking of world No. 385, achieved in October 2022, and a best doubles ranking of No. 610, reached in November 2022.

She made her WTA Tour main-draw debut at the 2021 Stuttgart Open, after defeating Jana Fett and Tamara Korpatsch in the qualifying.

ITF Circuit finals

Singles: 4 (3 titles, 1 runner–up)

Doubles: 2 (2 runner–ups)

References

External links
 
 

2003 births
Living people
German female tennis players
People from Vechta
Tennis people from Lower Saxony